David Bonser (1 February 1934 – 20 March 2005) was the Anglican Bishop of Bolton from 1991 until 1999.

Educated at King's College London Bonser studied for ordination at St Boniface Missionary College, Warminster. He became an Associate of King's College (AKC) in 1961 and later obtained an MA from the University of Manchester (1975).

He embarked upon curacies in Heckmondwike and Sheffield. From 1968 until 1972 he was Rector of St Clement's, Chorlton-cum-Hardy, and latterly an Honorary Canon of Manchester Cathedral. For nine years after that he was Archdeacon of Rochdale before elevation to the suffragan bishopric of Bolton in 1991. He retired eight years later and died on 20 March 2005.

References 

1934 births
2005 deaths
Alumni of King's College London
Alumni of the University of Manchester
20th-century English Anglican priests
Archdeacons of Rochdale
Bishops of Bolton
Associates of King's College London
Alumni of St Boniface Missionary College, Warminster